This article concerns LGBT history in the Nordic country of Denmark.

History

17th century 
1668 - Nicholas Culpeper and Abdiah Cole publish Thomas Bartholin's Anatomia. Bartholin briefly mentions lesbianism in this book. He uses the phrases, confricatrices rubster and contemptus vivorum, to describe female homosexuality. Bartholin cites historical examples of lesbianism,  such as Sappho, Philaenis, and the Book of Romans.
 1683 – The Kingdom of Denmark criminalizes "relations against nature", making it punishable by death.

20th century

1930s 

 1933: Homosexuality in Denmark was decriminalised.

1940s 
1948 – "Forbundet af 1948" ("League of 1948"), a homosexual group, is formed.

1970s 
1977: Denmark equalizes the age of consent.

1980s 
1985: F-48 became the Danish National Association of Gays and Lesbians (Landsforeningen for Bøsser og Lesbiske, Forbundet af 1948 or LBL).
 1989: Denmark is the first country in the world to enact registered partnership laws (like a civil union) for same-sex couples, with most of the same rights as marriage (excluding the right to adoption (until June 2010) and the right to marriage in a church); activists Axel and Eigil Axgil and 10 other Danish couples are unofficially married by Tom Ahlberg, the deputy mayor of Copenhagen, in the city hall, accompanied by worldwide media attention.

21st century

2010s 
2010: Same-sex couple adoption legislation is passed.
 2012: Same-sex marriage is passed into law.
 2014: Denmark becomes the first European country to remove the Gender Identity Disorder diagnosis as a necessary requirement in the gender recognition process.
 2016: Greenland passes same-sex marriage.
 2017: Denmark becomes the first country in the world to officially remove transgender identities from its list of mental health disorders. Same-sex marriage is passed in the Faroe Islands.

See also
 LGBT rights by country or territory

References

External links